The 1998–99 Vysshaya Liga season was the seventh season of the Vysshaya Liga, the second level of ice hockey in Russia. Ten teams participated in the league. Torpedo Nizhny Novgorod finished first, and the top six teams earned the right to participate in the qualification round of the Russian Superleague. Kristall Elektrostal, Dinamo-Energija Yekaterinburg, and Torpedo Nizhny Novgorod were promoted to the Superleague.

Standings

External links 
 Season on hockeyarchives.info
 Season on hockeyarchives.ru

Russian Major League seasons
2
1998–99 in European second tier ice hockey leagues